Thomas I d'Autremencourt, commonly misspelled de Stromoncourt, was the first Lord of Salona (modern Amfissa) in Central Greece. A knight from Autremencourt in Picardy, he was given Salona as a fief by Boniface of Montferrat, King of Thessalonica, in 1205 during the division of the Byzantine Empire after the Fourth Crusade. Thomas extended his domain over most of Phocis, from the Gulf of Corinth to the passes of Gravia in the north and the Parnassus in the east. Ca. 1210, he tried to extend his rule westwards, and attacked the port town of Galaxidi. Its inhabitants, however, called upon the ruler of Epirus, Michael I Komnenos Doukas, for aid. The Epirote army attacked and captured Salona, with Thomas himself falling in battle (ca. 1212). As the Epirote ruler was pre-occupied elsewhere, however, his occupation did not last long, and within a few years Thomas's son, Thomas II, was able to reclaim Salona.

Sources 
 
 
 

11th-century births
1210s deaths
Lords of Salona
People killed in action
Christians of the Fourth Crusade
People from Picardy